Pythons 2 (also known as Pythons, released on home media as Python II or Pythons II and sometimes listed in references as Python 2), is a science-fiction horror film released as a Sci Fi Pictures television film on Syfy. A 2002 sequel to the 2000 film Python, it stars Billy Zabka, reprising his role as Greg Larson from the first film, in addition to Dana Ashbrook and Simmone Jade Mackinnon. Directed by Lee McConnell, it was produced by Jeffery Beach and Phillip Roth.

Plot
In Russia, US Army Colonel Robert Evans Jefferson, Jr (Marcus Aurelius) has been tasked to lead Russian soldiers commanded by Sergeant Ivan Petrov on a secret mission to capture an 80-foot python that was created by American scientists and has gotten loose near the Ural Mountains. Not long ago, Colonel Jefferson and Sergeant Petrov, accomplish their assigned task (although one of Petrov's men is killed by the snake.) and the snakes are placed aboard an American cargo plane heading for the United States, Chechen rebels mistake the plane for a Russian one and they shoot it down, This alerts a Russian Army unit nearby, who then attack the rebels and subsequently take the mysterious container back to a nearby base. However, the creature escapes, and slaughters all the soldiers and scientists. The only survivor is the commander of the Russian military base, Colonel Zubov (Ivaylo Geraskov).

American Dwight Stoddard (Dana Ashbrook) and his Russian wife, Nalia (Simmone Jade Mackinnon,) run a shipping business in Russia. Greg Larson (Billy Zabka) hires them to move a mysterious container, which is holding another larger python, and they reach the isolated and deserted Russian military base where they discover Zubov. After being discovered about his true intentions by Dwight and Nalia, Larson engages Dwight in a fist fight and loses. As he attempts to surrender, a python slithers onto the scene behind him. Larson is momentarily confused. The snake growls and darts towards him. He whirls around and screams as the python coils around him. He tries to escape but creature has him tightly constricted in its coils. Dwight and Nalia look on with satisfaction. Dwight instructs his wife to leave them. The python briefly loosens its coils around Larson, who manages to scream out one more plea for Dwight to save him. Before Dwight can move, the python devours Larson whole. The snake is killed when a brick of C4 is hurled into its mouth by Dwight, while the other snake chases Dwight and Nalia outside where it is destroyed by a bombing run issued by Larson's superiors. Dwight and Nalia survive, and are rescued by Russian soldiers.

Cast 
 William Zabka as Greg Larson 
 Dana Ashbrook as Dwight Stoddard	  	 
 Alex Jolig as Matthew Coe	  	 
 Simmone Jade Mackinnon as Nalia	  	
 Marcus Aurelius as Colonel Robert Evans Jefferson Jr. 	  	 
 Mihail Miltchev as Hewitt	  	 
 Vladimir Kolev as Crawley 	  	 
 Kiril Efremov as Boyer
 Raicho Vasilev as Dirc	  	 
 Vadko Dimitrov as McKuen	  	 
 Anthony Nichols as Kerupkot  	 
 Velizar Binev as Aziz
 Tyron Pinkham as Pilot	  	 
 Sgt. Robert Sands as Co-Pilot	  	 
 Maxim Genchev as Old Chechen	  	 
 Hristo Shopov as Doctor	  	
 Ivaylo Geraskov as Colonel Zubov
 Ivan Barnev as Russian Soldier #1
 Georgi Ivanov as Russian soldier #2  	 
 Ivan Panev as Scientist #1 
 Stanislav Dimitrov as Scientist #2 	  	 
 Robert Zachar as Father	  	
 Bojka Velkova as Mother	  	
 Kiril Hristov as Spence
 Unknown Actor as Vladi (uncredited)
 Unknown Actor as Sergeant Ivan Petrov (uncredited)
 Unknown Actor as Sergey (uncredited)

Production
Pythons 2 was filmed in Sofia, Bulgaria. The visual effects supervisor was Alvaro Villagomez, the character animation supervisor as Yancy Calzada, and the digital effects supervisor was Florentino Calzada.

Reception
The DVD & Video Guide 2005 describes the movie as beginning "on a boring note and goes downhill from there". Doug Pratt states that Zabka's performance appears as if "he had sat through too many Emillio Esteves films" and called the cinematography of the DVD transfer "grainy". The Videohound's Golden Movie Retriever 2005 gave the film its lowest rating on a five-point scale.

See also
 List of killer snake films

References

External links
 

2002 films
2002 horror films
Giant monster films
American natural horror films
Bulgarian horror films
Films about snakes
Television sequel films
2000s English-language films
English-language Bulgarian films
Syfy original films
American horror television films
2000s American films